Crystal Pepsi was a clear cola soft drink made by PepsiCo. It was initially released in the United States and Canada from 1992 to 1994. Online grassroots revival efforts prompted brief re-releases throughout the mid-2010s. It was briefly sold in the United Kingdom and Australia.

Its flavor resembles standard Pepsi, without caramel color, reportedly making it taste less "acidic".

History

Background
A global marketing fad in the 1980s and 1990s called the Clear Craze equated clarity with purity, reaching basic retail markets with the reintroduction of Ivory soap with a marketing slogan of "99 and 44/100 percent pure". Meanwhile, soft drink sales boomed in the 1980s with popularization of diet drinks, but in 1991 slowed to a 1.8% growth rate. Pepsi-Cola North America CEO Craig Weatherup was ambitiously internally restructuring the company while launching a multi-faceted development and marketing plan to expand as a "total beverage company". This included the fast-growing and expandable New Age beverage market, with established competition from Clearly Canadian (reportedly having "built a new market in two years"), Nordic Mist, Snapple, and the waning Original New York Seltzer. PepsiCo was reportedly "a lot more free-thinking and willing to make errors ... [already having] made some very good errors".

Development
PepsiCo's internal research already had "1,000 different product concepts", but its consumer research demanded a healthier variety of cola, which was the number one soft-drink segment at 60% and yet slowing. Food technologists knew that food color strongly affects flavor perceptions, associating light flavors with light colors. Pepsi's traditional caramel coloring, which adds body and flavor, was replaced with modified food starch for body with a clear look. PepsiCo devised 3,000 formulations of a new clear drink, under consumer testing. A  serving of Crystal Pepsi has 134 calories compared to Pepsi's 154 calories20 fewer. In November 1991, Pepsi-Cola publicly confirmed that it was working on a colorless version of Pepsi.

On April 13, 1992, Crystal Pepsi was launched in test markets of Dallas, Providence, Salt Lake City, and Colorado to a positive response. One month in test markets showed an unusually and unexpectedly strong launch due to product uniqueness and unprecedented consumer awareness. In Colorado, interviews of 100,000 customers further revealed demand for Diet Crystal Pepsi, which was launched there in October.

Full launch
Crystal Pepsi was launched nationwide in the US on December 14, 1992. Coca-Cola followed by launching Tab Clear on December 14, 1992. 

The Coca-Cola Company had produced a clear cola in the past, produced as a secret one-off made as a particular political favor between President Dwight D. Eisenhower and the Soviet Union in the 1950s. Clear Coca-Cola, named White Coke, was produced in order to disguise the beverage as vodka. In 1990, a Canadian manufacturer released a colorless cola, called Canadian Spirit, which it tested in Boston, New York, Washington, Toronto, and Montreal.

During the same year that Crystal Pepsi was released, several other manufacturers also released colorless versions of their existing products, such as colorless Palmolive dish soap, colorless Softsoap liquid soap, and colorless Rembrandt mouthwash. Even the Miller Brewing Company released a colorless beer, called Miller Clear, in Richmond, Minneapolis, and Austin the following year.

By late 1993, Crystal Pepsi was discontinued, and the final batches were delivered to retailers during the first few months of 1994. Several months later, Pepsi briefly released a reformulated citrus-cola hybrid called Crystal From Pepsi.

In 2005, Pepsi Clear was sold in Mexico for a limited time. On August 22, 2008, PepsiCo filed for trademarks on the product names "Pepsi Clear" and "Diet Pepsi Clear".

Marketing 
Crystal Pepsi was marketed as a caffeine-free "clear alternative" to normal colas. Its official slogan was "You've never seen a taste like this".

Gary Hemphill, public relations manager for Pepsico Inc, said "The basic philosophy behind Crystal Pepsi is this: Crystal Pepsi is not Pepsi with the color stripped out. It's a totally new product. It tastes differently than Pepsi [... which we married] to some of the attributes of the so-called New Age type products: lighter and less sweet tasting, clear, caffeine-free, all natural flavors, and no preservatives." A senior vice president relayed expectation of forging "an entirely new category that really transcends New Age". Test marketing suggested that 80% of sales would come from non-Pepsi consumers.

The company invented the world's first photo-realistic, computer-generated bus wrap printing. A series of television advertisements featuring Van Halen's hit song "Right Now" premiered on national television on January 31, 1993, during Super Bowl XXVII. This advertisement was parodied by Saturday Night Live as Crystal Gravy. Full-sized sample bottles were distributed with the Sunday paper deliveries such as the Boston Globe in Massachusetts.

According to Coca-Cola's chief marketing officer, Sergio Zyman, Tab Clear was released at the same time, as an intentional "kamikaze" effort to create an unpopular beverage that was positioned as an analogue of Crystal Pepsi in order to "kill both in the process". The "born to die" strategy included using the poor-performing Tab brand rather than Coke, labeling the product as a "sugar free" diet drink to confuse consumers into thinking Crystal Pepsi had no sugar, and marketing the product as if it were "medicinal". Zyman said "Pepsi spent an enormous amount of money on the brand and, regardless, we killed it. Both of them were dead within six months."

Yum! Brands chairman David C. Novak is credited with introducing the Crystal Pepsi concept. In a December 2007 interview, he reminisced:

Reception
Beverage Digest said "This is another instance where Pepsi has really shown leadership to strike out in a new direction." Crystal Pepsi was named Best New Product of the Year for 1992 by Richard Saunders International, based on consumer preference polls among 16,000 new grocery products, scoring higher than any other beverage in the poll's history. Robert McMath, editor of Brand Week, said that "new sells [and] clarity equals purity" but he doubted the strategy of positioning such a new and different product directly alongside the old flagship product.

Consumer revival
In September 2014, following a Facebook campaign by consumers, The Coca-Cola Company reintroduced the soft drink Surge, leading to speculation in the public and media about the return of Crystal Pepsi. In March 2015, an online grassroots campaign to bring back Crystal Pepsi began. The following month, a second, separate petition was led by an online competitive eating personality, Kevin Strahle, also known as The L.A. Beast, who had made a 2013 viral video of himself drinking a 1990s vintage bottle of Crystal Pepsi. This generated enough interest for a telephone and email campaign, garnering around 37,000 Change.org petition signatures, tens of thousands of Twitter, YouTube, and Instagram tagged comments, 15 billboards erected around the Los Angeles area, and a commitment to ride a mobile billboard truck at Pepsi's headquarters in Purchase, New York with a gathering of supporters at a park nearby on June 15 and 16, 2015.

The interest from this campaign led to an official response to Strahle by PepsiCo on June 8, 2015: "We've had customers ask us to bring back their favorite products before, but never with your level of enthusiasm and humor. We're lucky to have a Pepsi superfan like you on our side. We definitely hear you and your followers and we think you'll all be happy with what's in store. Stay tuned." In mid-2016, Crystal Pepsi was released across the United States and Canada, promoted with a retro styled website and marketing video, including The Crystal Pepsi Trail browser game as an officially licensed parody of the classic The Oregon Trail.

See also 

 List of Pepsi types
 List of defunct consumer brands
 New Coke
 Coca-Cola Clear
 Zima

References 

PepsiCo cola brands
Products introduced in 1992